HD 116029 is a binary star system about  away. 

The primary subgiant star HD 116029 A belongs to the spectral class K1. Its age is younger than the Sun`s at 2.7 billion years. The primary star is slightly enriched by heavy elements, having 130% of solar abundance. The primary star does not have detectable flare activity.

In 2016 the co-moving binary stellar companion HD 116029 B was detected. It is a red dwarf star of visual magnitude 16. The companion was confirmed orbiting the primary at a projected separation of 171 AU in 2017.

Planetary system
In 2011 one superjovian planet, HD 116029 b, on a mildly eccentric orbit around star HD 116029 A was discovered utilizing the radial velocity method. One more planet on a wider orbit was detected in 2016. The planets b and c are orbiting in a 2:3 orbital resonance.

References

Coma Berenices
Planetary systems with two confirmed planets
Multi-star planetary systems
J13203954+2438555
065117
Durchmusterung objects
116029
K-type subgiants
M-type main-sequence stars